The New York Times occasionally allows the publication of an anonymous op-ed piece when there is concern over the consequences of publishing the author's real name. Only a handful of anonymous pieces have been published by The New York Times throughout its history. The context and process of anonymous publications were discussed with readers in 2018, under the form of a "Frequently Asked Questions" article.

List

Reactions 
President Trump called for Attorney General Jeff Sessions to investigate the source of the "I Am Part of the Resistance Inside the Trump Administration" essay, sparking calls to defend both the anonymity of the source and the freedom of the press.

References 

The New York Times
Opinion journalism
New York Times